Persoonia pertinax is a species of flowering plant in the family Proteaceae and is endemic to Western Australia.

Description

Taxonomy
Persoonia pertinax was first formally described in 1994 by Peter Weston in the journal Telopea from specimens collected by Robert Royce near Queen Victoria Spring in 1956. The specific epithet means "tenacious" or "unyielding", referring to the species' ability to survive in its arid environment.

Distribution and habitat
This geebung grows in sandy soil in woodland near Cundeelee in the Coolgardie and Great Victoria Desert biogeographic regions of Western Australia.

Conservation status
Persoonia pertinax is classified as "not threatened" by the Government of Western Australia Department of Parks and Wildlife.

References

pertinax
Flora of Western Australia
Plants described in 1994
Taxa named by Peter H. Weston